The 1931–32 Kansas Jayhawks men's basketball team represented the University of Kansas during the 1931–32 college men's basketball season.

Roster
Paul Harrington
William Johnson
Theodore O'Leary
Leland Page
Elmer Schaake
Ernest Vanek

Schedule

Per the January 4, 1932 Lawrence Daily Journal World the first two Kansas State College games were not part of the Big 6 Conference schedule, so they are not counted as conference games.

References

Kansas Jayhawks men's basketball seasons
Kansas
Kansas
Kansas